The following lists events that happened during 1974 in Singapore.

Incumbents
President: Benjamin Henry Sheares
Prime Minister: Lee Kuan Yew

Events

January
 26 January – The Brani Naval Base is officially opened as Singapore's first naval base.
 31 January – Laju incident: Japanese Red Army bombs petroleum tanks at Pulau Bukom and hijacks a ferry boat.

February
 15 February – The Singapore Cable Car is officially opened to link up Mount Faber with Sentosa, making it the first system to span a harbour.

April
 1 April -
The Singapore Telephone Board merges into the Telecommunication Authority of Singapore, forming a single statutory board. This will streamline telecommunication services and increase efficiency.
The Urban Redevelopment Authority is formed to redevelop the Central Area.

May
 1 May - RTS Channel 5 began its very first colour television signal with the very first colour comedy programme of The Mary Tyler Moore Show.

June
 25 June – Temasek Holdings is formed to manage investments in government-linked companies (GLCs).

July
 7 July - RTS Channel 5 began its colour broadcasts at 10:10pm SGT with the very first colour programme being a live telecast of that year's FIFA World Cup final between West Germany (two goal) and Netherlands (one goal) narrated by Brian Richmond relayed via satellite transmission was officially name as RTS Color/RTS Colour or RTS Channel 5 Color/RTS Channel 5 Colour. About 2,000 colour television sets were sold in Singapore three days before the match.

August
 9 August – RTS Channel 5 began its officially opening colour broadcasts at 4:44pm SGT with the very first colour live programme of Singapore's 9th national day parade was held at the Padang, Singapore for the first time in all four languages.
 17 August – A second Satellite Earth Station with an antenna is launched at the Sentosa Satellite Earth Station.

Births
 8 April – Adam Khoo, entrepreneur, author, trainer, and stocks and FX trader
 16 May – Beatrice Chia, actress and director.
 24 June – Andrea De Cruz, actress.
 17 August – Low Yen Ling, politician.
 Corrinne May, singer.

References

 
Years in Singapore